Elisa Cabello (born 12 October 1956) is a Spanish gymnast. She competed in five events at the 1976 Summer Olympics.

References

1956 births
Living people
Spanish female artistic gymnasts
Olympic gymnasts of Spain
Gymnasts at the 1976 Summer Olympics
Sportspeople from Seville